The Philadelphia Department of Prisons is operated by the city of Philadelphia in Pennsylvania. The facilities are located on State Road in Northeast Philadelphia. Shawn Hawes is the public spokesperson for the Philadelphia Prison System.

Prisons
Philadelphia Department of Prisons operates four facilities:

Curran-Fromhold Correctional Facility
Curran-Fromhold Correctional Facility (CFCF) houses approximately 2,000 male inmates of all custody levels. The facility was named in honor of Warden Patrick N. Curran and Deputy Warden Robert F. Fromhold, who were murdered at Holmesburg Prison on May 31, 1973. They are the only PDP staff known to have been killed in the line of duty. CFCF opened in 1995 and is the largest PDP facility. CFCF consists of four housing buildings and an administration building.

Each building has eight housing units with each unit consisting of 32 cells. The units are divided into two tiers. Inmates housed on each unit have access to indoor and outdoor recreation, medical triage, law library, and program areas. The food production facility has the capacity to produce 40,000 meals daily. CFCF is a 24-hour intake center for adult males. Nearly 30,000 males are processed through the facility's receiving room on an annual basis.

Detention Center
The Detention Center (DC) houses approximately 1,200 medium custody male inmates. The DC opened in 1963, replacing the defunct Moyamensing Prison as an intake center for the Philadelphia Department of Prisons. The Detention Center is a PDP male intake center until the intake function was transferred to CFCF in 1995. Currently, the facility houses mostly minimum-custody adult males and contains the PDP's Medical Unit. Inmates who require direct physical or behavioral health observation and supervision are located at the DC.

Philadelphia Industrial Correction Center

The Philadelphia Industrial Correction Center (PICC) opened in 1986 holds approximately 900 medium custody adult male inmates. It was the first PDP facility constructed to operate on the basis of unit management. PICC's is split into 13 housing units arranged around separate yards, laundry facilities, medical triage areas, counseling rooms, and staff offices, vocational training areas, law libraries and chapels. PICC has two housing areas designated as behavioral health transition units.

Riverside Correctional Facility and Dorms

The Riverside Correctional Facility and Dorms (RCF) opened in 2004 and can house approximately 350 female inmates as well as 99 community custody male inmates. The facility was designed for PDP's female population. Each unit's management group includes a lieutenant, sergeant and treatment clerical staff. The facility contains classrooms for education and training, an intake and discharge area, and a gymnasium, The medical and behavioral health offices include a nurses' station, pharmacy, lab, dental, examination, x-ray, and emergency treatment rooms, as well as areas for AIDS counseling, records, equipment, and other storage.

The Dorms at RCF houses minimum and community-custody men and women, inmates serving sentences on weekends, work release inmates and others. Inmates may be selected by the PDP or ordered by the courts to participate in the work-release program. The program attempted to reintegrate prisoners into society with employment training. Some inmates sentenced to the work-release program continue in the jobs they had prior to incarceration, and has GED-preparation classes.

Riverside Correctional Facility switched to house males in summer of 2020.

Defunct prisons
 Holmesburg Prison (decommissioned in 1995)
 Philadelphia House of Correction (depopulated in 2018, anticipated closure and decommission in 2020)

References

External links
 

Prisons in Pennsylvania
Buildings and structures in Philadelphia
Holmesburg, Philadelphia
Government departments of Philadelphia
Crime in Philadelphia